The 2017–18 Polish Basketball League (PLK) season, the Energa Basket Liga for sponsorship reasons, was the 84th season of the Polish Basketball League, the highest professional basketball league in the Poland. The season started on 30 September 2017 and ended 4 June 2018. Anwil Włocławek won its second ever title in club history.

Teams
Polfarmex Kutno and Siarka Tarnobrzeg were relegated to the I Liga after finishing in the 15th and 16th place in the 2016–17 PLK season. Legia Warsaw promoted to the PLK 15 years later, after winning the I Liga championship.

On July 28, 2017, the PLK announced it expanded the number of teams to 17 by giving a wild card to GTK Gliwice, the runner-up of the I Liga.
Locations and venues

Regular season

League table

Playoffs
Quarterfinals and semifinals are played in a best-of-five format (2-2-1) while the finals in a best-of-seven one (2-2-1-1-1). The third place series are played in a double-legged format.

Bracket

Quarterfinals

|}

Semifinals

|}

Third-place game

|}

Final

|}

Awards
PLK Most Valuable Player

PLK Finals MVP

All-PLK Team

In European competitions

References

External links
Polska Liga Koszykówki - Official Site 
Polish League at Eurobasket.com

Polish Basketball League seasons
1
Poland